Telos is a term used by philosopher Aristotle to refer to the final cause of a natural organ or entity, or of human art. Telos is the root of the modern term teleology, the study of purposiveness or of objects with a view to their aims, purposes, or intentions. Teleology,  is central in Aristotle's work on plant and animal biology, and human ethics, through his theory of the four causes. Aristotle's notion that everything has a telos also gave rise to epistemology.

In Aristotle 
Telos has been consistently used in the writings of Aristotle, in which the term, on several occasions, denotes 'goal'. It is considered synonymous to teleute ('end'), particularly in Aristotle's discourse about the plot-structure in Poetics. The philosopher went as far as to say that telos can encompass all forms of human activity. One can say, for instance, that the telos of warfare is victory, or the telos of business is the creation of wealth. Within this conceptualization, there are telos that are subordinate to other telos, as all activities have their own, respective goals.

For Aristotle, these subordinate telos can become the means to achieve more fundamental telos. Through this concept, for instance, the philosopher underscored the importance of politics and that all other fields are subservient to it. He explained that the telos of the blacksmith is the production of a sword, while that of the swordsman's, which uses the weapon as a tool, is to kill or incapacitate an enemy. On the other hand, the telos of these occupations are merely part of the purpose of a ruler, who must oversee the direction and well-being of a state.

Moreover, it can be understood as the "supreme end of man's endeavour".

Telos vs techne 
Telos is associated with the concept called techne, which is the rational method involved in producing an object or accomplishing a goal or objective. In the Theuth/Thamus myth, for instance, the section covering techne referred to telos and techne together. The two methods are, however, not mutually exclusive in principle. These are demonstrated in the cases of writing and seeing, as explained by Martin Heidegger: the former is considered a form of techne, as the end product lies beyond (para) the activity of producing; whereas, in seeing, there is no remainder outside of or beyond the activity itself at the moment it is accomplished. Aristotle, for his part, simply designated sophia (also referred to as the arete or excellence of philosophical reflection) as the consummation or the final cause (telos) of techne. Heidegger attempted to explain the Aristotelian conceptualization outlined in the Nicomachean Ethics, where the eidosthe soul of the makerwas treated as the arche of the thing made (ergon). In this analogy, the telos constitutes the arche but in a certain degree not at the disposition of techne.

In modern 
Action theory also makes essential use of teleological vocabulary. From Donald Davidson's perspective, an action is just something an agent does with an intentioni.e., looking forward to some end to be achieved by the action. Action is considered just a step that is necessary to fulfill human telos, as it leads to habits.

According to the Marxist perspective, historical change is dictated by socio-economic structures, which means that laws largely determine the realization of the telos of the class struggle.

See also
 Conatus
 Dysteleology
 Metaphysics
 Plato
 Polytely
 Teleological argument
 Teleonomy

References

External links
 Teleological Notions in Biology, Stanford Encyclopedia of Philosophy
 Alexander, Victoria N. Narrative Telos: The Ordering Tendencies of Chance. Dactyl Foundation.

Action (philosophy)
Aristotelianism
Concepts in ancient Greek metaphysics
Concepts in social philosophy
Philosophy of Aristotle
Teleology